Captain Phillips may refer to:

 Richard Phillips (merchant mariner), captain of the MV Maersk Alabama taken hostage by Somali pirates in April 2009
 Captain Phillips (film), a 2013 film about Captain Richard Phillips and the 2009 piracy incident
 Mark Phillips, former British Army captain and ex-husband of Anne, Princess Royal